USS K-3 (SS-34) was a K-class submarine built for the United States Navy during the 1910s.

Description
They displaced  on the surface and  submerged. The K-class submarines had a crew of 2 officers and 26 enlisted men.

For surface running, the boats were powered by two  NELSECO diesel engines, each driving one propeller shaft. When submerged each propeller was driven by a  electric motor. They could reach  on the surface and  underwater.

The K-class submarines were armed with four 18 inch (450 mm)  torpedo tubes in the bow. They carried four reloads, for a total of eight torpedoes.

Construction and career
The boat was laid down by Union Iron Works in San Francisco, California, as Orca, making her the first ship of the United States Navy to be named for the orca, another name for the grampus or killer whale, but on 17 November 1911, during construction, she was renamed K-3. She was launched on 14 March 1914 sponsored by Mrs. Clarence Meigs Oddie, and commissioned on 30 October 1914. K-3 joined 3rd Submarine Division, Pacific Torpedo Flotilla 11, December 1914 and operated along the California coast developing underwater warfare tactics and coordinating the use of underseas craft with the fleet. She arrived in Hawaiian waters 14 October 1915 to perform similar exercises in the light of increasing emphasis on submarine warfare.

The United States's entry into World War I placed a greater urgency on the need for experienced submariners, and K-3 was dispatched to Key West, Florida, arriving 8 January 1918. For the remainder of the war, she conducted patrols along the Florida coast while training men in underwater techniques.  K-3 continued operations along the East Coast after the war, testing new devices such as listening gear, storage batteries and torpedoes. On 7 November 1922, the submarine arrived Hampton Roads and decommissioned there 20 February 1923. She was scrapped 3 June 1931.

Notes

References

External links
 

United States K-class submarines
World War I submarines of the United States
Ships built in San Francisco
1914 ships
Ships built by Union Iron Works